The Journal of the Atmospheric Sciences (until 1962 titled Journal of Meteorology) is a scientific journal published by the American Meteorological Society. It covers basic research related to the physics, dynamics, and chemistry of the atmosphere of Earth and other planets, with emphasis on the quantitative and deductive aspects of the subject.

See also 
 List of scientific journals in earth and atmospheric sciences

References

External links 
 

English-language journals
Monthly journals
Publications established in 1944
American Meteorological Society academic journals